Dinesh Kaushik (born 27 May 1957) is an Indian actor. He is a post graduate in Indian theatre from the Punjab University, Chandigarh. He has worked with professional theatre groups in Mumbai. He has appeared in many advertisements, television shows and movies. He is currently playing Narsinghrao Pradhanmantri (the prime minister of Jhansi) in Jhansi Ki Rani (Zee TV). He has acted in Raghukul Reet Sada Chali Aayi on Doordarshan.

Career 
He is a TV actor, who started his career with theatre, and took active part in Majma and Ekjute theatre groups, respectively. He became a household face with television commercials. Dinesh Kaushik has been the face for leading brands including Godrej Interio, Rustomjee, Cadbury, Thumbs Up, Tree Top, Keo-Karpin, Mayur Suitings, Vicks, Hero Honda Motor Bikes, Surf, and Girnar Tea. He moved his concentration towards television serials and movies. He has appeared in the T-series video album Main Pardesi Hoon.

Personal life 
He is married to Ragini and has two daughters Ruchika and Simran.

Television 

Jhansi Ki Rani on Zee TV
Pancham on Zee TV
 1993 Commander on Zee TV
Hip Hip Hurray on Zee TV
 Parampara on Zee TV
Ghar Ki Lakshmi Betiyaan on Zee TV
Tum Bin Jaaoon Kahaan on Zee TV
X Zone on Zee TV
Kora Kagaz on Star Plus
Kumkum - Ek Pyara Sa Bandhan on Star Plus
Meri Awaz Ko Mil Gayi Roshni on Star Plus
Kyunki Saas Bhi Kabhi Bahu Thi on Star Plus
Raaz...Ki Ek Baatt on Doordarshan
Raghukul Reet Sada Chali Aayi on Doordarshan
 Kuntee on SAB TV
Bahadur Shah Zafar (TV series) on Doordarshan
Mahabharat on Doordarshan 
Anugoonj on Doordarshan
Shiv Maha Puran on Doordarshan
Swabhimaan on Doordarshan
Remix on StarOne
Ssshhhh...Koi Hai on StarOne
Ssshhhh...Phir Koi Hai on StarOne
Vaidehi on Sony TV
Par Is Dil Ko Kaise Samjhae on Sony TV
C.I.D on Sony TV
Aahat on Sony TV
Saaya on Sony TV  Special Appearance from episode no 41-45
Zameen Se Aassman Tak on Sahara TV
Punarvivaah on Zee TV
Main Lakshmi Tere Aangan Ki on Life Ok
Tujh Sang Preet Lagai Sajna on Sahara One
Choti Sarrdaarni on Colors
Vish on Colors

Films 

Ankush  (1986)
Jeena Teri Gali Mein (1991)
Aaj Ka Goonda Raj  (1992)
Jo Jeeta Wahi Sikandar (1992)
Bedardi (1993) as Bharat Desai
Gopalaa (1993) as Dr Dandekar
Mahakaal (1994)
Dilwale (1994)
Karan (1994) 
Sarfarosh  (1998)
Badhaai Ho Badhaai (2002)
Tere Naam (2003)
Vaada (2005)
Bhoot Unkle (2006)
3rd Eye (2019)

References

External links
 
 
 

1957 births
Living people
Indian male television actors
Indian male film actors
Indian male voice actors
20th-century Indian male actors
21st-century Indian male actors